Vaimo'oi'a Astrid Ripley (born ~1990) is a Samoan competitive sailor who has represented Samoa at the Pacific Games.

Ripley was born in Samoa and has been sailing since the age of eight. She competed at the 2007 Pacific Games when she was 17. At the 2019 Pacific Games in Apia she came 6th in the individual Laser Radial, but won gold (alongside Bianca Leilua) in the team competition. In 2021 she attended the 2021 Laser Radial World Championships in Al-Musannah, Oman. In February 2022 she finished third in the NSW/ACT State Masters Championships.

Ripley also plays touch rugby and was part of the Samoan team attending the 2019 Touch Football World Cup in Putrajaya, Malaysia.

References

Living people
Samoan female sailors (sport)
20th-century Samoan people
21st-century Samoan people
Year of birth missing (living people)